Logvinovka is a rural locality (a settlement) in Starooskolsky District, Belgorod Oblast, Russia. The population was 24 as of 2010. There is 1 street.

Geography 
Logvinovka is located 36 km east of Stary Oskol (the district's administrative centre) by road. Potudan is the nearest rural locality.

References 

Rural localities in Starooskolsky District